Ellenor Catherine Watson  (née Squires, 22 April 1907 – 24 June 1966) was a notable New Zealand rural women's advocate and community leader. She was born in Nelson, New Zealand, in 1907.

In 1953, Watson was awarded the Queen Elizabeth II Coronation Medal. In the 1963 Queen's Birthday Honours, she was appointed an Officer of the Order of the British Empire, in recognition of her service as national president of Women's Division of Federated Farmers.

References

1907 births
1966 deaths
New Zealand activists
New Zealand women activists
People from Nelson, New Zealand
People educated at Nelson College for Girls
New Zealand Officers of the Order of the British Empire
Burials at Eastern Cemetery, Invercargill